Grand Port is a district of Mauritius, situated in the east of the island. The name means "large port" in French. The district has an area of 260.3 km2 and the population estimate was at 112,997 as of 31 December 2015.

History

Grand Port is named after the village of 'Old Grand Port' which saw the first Dutch landing and the first port of the island. It is centered on the town of Mahébourg on the coast, inside the Grand Port Bay. Built by the Dutch and later taken over by the French, the town is a reminder of the colonial past of the island.

In 1810, a French squadron of frigates achieved an ultimately futile naval victory over a comparable British squadron at the Battle of Grand Port, near the Île de la Passe.

Places of interest

The district's most well known and popular beaches is Blue Bay, one of the finest bathing spots on the island surrounded by a semicircle of filao trees. Situated on the southeast coast, not far from Mahébourg, Blue Bay offers a fine stretch of white sandy beach, and a deep, clear, light-blue bathing pool. There is also scope for yachting and windsurfing. Many structures in the district reflect the colonial past of the district.

Just north of Mahebourg, Vallée de Ferney contains indigenous forests and a range of endangered plants and animals. Off the coast, Ile aux Aigrettes is a small island where the original ecosystems of Mauritius have been to some degree rehabilitated. The bay of Grand-bay also known as Mahebourg bay itself offers a relatively well preserved underwater flora and fauna which makes it an ideal snorkeling site.

Places
The Grand Port District include different regions; however, some regions are further divided into different suburbs. Midlands and Seizième Mille village council areas are geographically in Plaines Wilhems district and have thus not been included in the places found in Grand Port. However, the residents do vote in local elections for the Grand Port District council. 
Note that the statistics do not take into account that Camp Carol was created out of Trois Boutiques and that Trois Boutiques was renamed Trois Boutiques (Union Vale) in 2011 following the new Local Government Act. The islands only airport of Sir Seewoosagur Ramgoolam International Airport is located in the Grand Port District.

Places by population

Gallery

See also

List of places in Mauritius

References

 
Districts of Mauritius
1666 establishments in the Dutch Empire